Wagner Butte is a summit in the U.S. state of Oregon.

Wagner Butte was named in 1852 after one Jacob Wagner.

References

Buttes of Oregon
Mountains of Jackson County, Oregon
Mountains of Oregon